Gaza polychoronos is a species of sea snail, a marine gastropod mollusk in the family Margaritidae.

Description
The height of the shell attains 18 mm.

Distribution
This marine species occurs off the Society Islands, French Polynesia.

References

 Vilvens C. (2012) New species and new records of Seguenzioidea and Trochoidea (Gastropoda) from French Polynesia. Novapex 13(1): 1-23.

External links
 To World Register of Marine Species
 

polychoronos
Gastropods described in 2012